The Christmas Channel was an American radio network that primarily aired traditional and popular Christmas music to 35 affiliate radio stations across the United States. The Christmas Channel was a property of Cumulus Media Networks (through Cumulus Media) and was active from the day before Thanksgiving Day through Christmas Day.

History

"The Christmas Channel" started out as seasonal programming on ABC Radio's Memories/Unforgettable Favorites satellite format in 1998 under The Walt Disney Company's control. On Thanksgiving Day, ABC Radio would switch programming to Christmas music and the day after Christmas Day, it would switch back to regular programming. With the merger of "Unforgettable Favorites" and "Timeless Classics" in 2006, "The Christmas Channel" became a stand-alone network. In 2007, this network (as well as other ABC Radio formats) were transferred to Citadel Broadcasting. Citadel merged with Cumulus Media on September 16, 2011.

Citadel has indicated that The Christmas Channel would air, instead of on its usual separate channel, in place of the Classic Hits format Citadel distributes for the 2010 season. The stand-alone network returned in 2011, this time launching on November 1 to accommodate early adopters.

Cumulus Media Networks was the only commercial network to carry such a seasonal format; its former competitor, Dial Global, along with its recently purchased assets Jones and Waitt did not offer such a format. As Cumulus Media Networks merged with Dial Global to form Westwood One, the channel was discontinued.

Sample Hour of Programming
"It's Beginning to Look a Lot Like Christmas" - Bing Crosby
"Sleigh Ride" - Boston Pops Orchestra
"Christmastime Is Here (Vocal Version)" - Vince Guaraldi
"Wonderful Christmastime" - Paul McCartney
"Christmas Eve/Sarajevo 12/24" - Trans-Siberian Orchestra
"O Come All Ye Faithful" - Mormon Tabernacle Choir
"Merry Christmas Darling" - The Carpenters
"What Child Is This" - Kenny G
"Rockin' around the Christmas Tree" - Brenda Lee
"Feliz Navidad" - José Feliciano
"O Holy Night" - Josh Groban
"Rudolph the Red-Nosed Reindeer" - Gene Autry
"The Christmas Song" - Nat King Cole
"Santa Baby" - Eartha Kitt

Affiliates (partial list)
Chicago, Illinois - WLS-AM
Detroit, Michigan - WJR-AM
New York City, New York - WABC-AM
Oak Ridge, Tennessee - WCYQ
San Francisco, California - KSFO-AM
Data as of December 6, 2007.

References

Christmas music
Defunct radio networks in the United States
Former subsidiaries of The Walt Disney Company
Defunct radio stations in the United States